Derek Samagalski (born September 9, 1984) is a Canadian curler who currently resides in Carberry, Manitoba. Samagalski won a bronze medal at the 2012 Tim Hortons Brier as lead, where he also won the first team all-star award for the position.

Career
Samagalski gained notoriety when he won the 2012 Safeway Championship again as a lead on the Rob Fowler team to represent Manitoba at the Tim Hortons Brier. Samagalski was named the first-team all star for lead at the Brier following their bronze medal victory.

Personal life
Samagalski is married and has one daughter. He is employed as a superintendent for Carberry Sandhills Golf Course.

References

External links

Living people
1984 births
Curlers from Winnipeg
Sportspeople from Brandon, Manitoba
Canadian male curlers
Continental Cup of Curling participants
Canada Cup (curling) participants
People from Carberry, Manitoba